Mod Fuck Explosion is a 1994 film by Jon Moritsugu about a young girl named London who is trying to find meaning in the world, or a leather jacket of her very own. Unaccepted by the Mods or the bikers, she tries to find her own path through life. Meanwhile, the Mods and the bikers have a vendetta against each other that is sure to erupt in a smorgasbord of violence. The film was written by Moritsugu and stars his wife Amy Davis as the angst ridden London.

Awards and Festivals 
Mod Fuck Explosion won "Best Feature" at the New York Underground Film Festival in 1995, as well as "Best Feature" in the 1996 Honolulu Underground Film Festival and "2nd Place Feature" in the Freakzone Film Festival in France. Mod Fuck Explosion also was accepted to these following festivals: Berlin Film Festival; Cannes Film Festival; Mannheim-Heidelberg Film Festival, Germany; Vancouver Film Festival; Stockholm Film Festival; Singapore International Film Festival; Chicago Underground Film Festival; The Fringe Fest, Australia; Copenhagen Film Festival; Asian American International Film Festival, NYC; Goteberg Film Festival, Sweden; USA Film Festival, Dallas; St. Louis Film Festival; San Francisco Asian American Film Festival; Institute of Contemporary Art, London.

Credits 
Written and Directed by Jon Moritsugu

Cast 
 Amy Davis- London
 Desi del Valle- M16
 Bonnie Steiger- Mother
 Jacques Boyreau- Madball (Mod)
 Victor Fischbarg- X-Ray Spex (Mod) (as Victor of Aquitaine)
 Alyssa Wendt- Cake (Mod)
 Bonnie Dickenson- Cherry (Mod)
 Lane McClain- Shame (Mod)
 Abigail Hamilton- Columbine (Mod)
 Deena Davenport- Babette (Mod)
 Sarah Janene Pullen- Snap (Mod)
 Jonathan Scott Fellman- Satellite (Mod)
 Patrick Bavasi- Tack (Mod)
 Jon Moritsugu- Kazumi (Biker)
 Issa Bowser- Deathray (Biker)
 James Duval- Smack (Biker)
 Christine Wada- Biker girl (Biker)
 Anthony Kwan- Razorblade (Biker)
 Nicholas Lyovin- Sledgehammer (Biker)
 Elisabeth Canning- Cleopatra (Biker)
 Lisa Guay- Nasty (Biker)
 Fred Brandon Chu- Wheelchair (Biker)
 Justin Bond- Amphetamine
 Leigh Crow- Candyman
 Timothy Innes- Nail Clipper Yuppie
 Heiko Arnold Adler- Warhead
 Nancy Allen- Mexico
 Jefferson Davis Parker III- Bar Creep
 Mark Beaver- Cock thief
 Dan Kandel- Sidekick
 Michelle Haunold- Records seller
 Kathleen Blihar- Pale at the record shop / bar stool
 Jude Brown- Pale at the record shop
 Michael Clare- Pale at the record shop
 Andrew Forward- Pale at the record shop
 Clifford Webb- Kustom Kar Jock Boy
 Vincent Haverty- Kustom Kar Jock Boy
 Peter Martinez- Kustom Kar Jock Boy
 Lady- Dame at bar
 Christine Shields- Step dancer
 Henry S. Rosenthal- Drummer
 Jon Jost- Drummer
 Antonia Kohl- Bar stool
 Jim Dwyer- Bar stool
 Thet Win- Bar stool
 James Pask- Bus driver

Crew 
 Marcus Hu- executive producer
 Timothy Innes- associate producer
 Jon Moritsugu- producer
 Henry S. Rosenthal- producer
 Andrea Sperling- co-producer
 American Soul Spiders- Original Music	 	
 Dixieland- Original Music	 	
 Tengoku Karyo- Original Music	 	
 Unrest- Original Music	 	
 Todd Verow- Cinematographer	 	
 Jon Moritsugu- Film Editing	 	
 Todd Verow- Production Design	 	
 Jennifer M. Gentile- Art Direction	 	
 Jason Rail- hair stylist
 Jason Rail- makeup artist
 Michelle De Lorimer- sound
 Alenka Pavlin- sound
 Deidre Schletter- sound
 Fred Brandon Chu- gaffer
 Fred Brandon Chu- key grip
 Patrick Taylor- first assistant camera
 Marianne Dissard- special thanks
 Clay Walker- special thanks

References

External links 

Films shot in San Francisco
Films set in London
1994 films
1990s English-language films